Emoia cyclops, also known commonly as the Cyclops emo skink and Cyclop's skink, is a species of lizard in the family Scincidae. The species is endemic to Indonesia.

Etymology
The specific name, cyclops, is a reference to the type locality which is the Cyclops Mountains.

Geographic range
E. cyclops is found in northern Papua Province, Indonesian New Guinea.

Habitat

Reproduction
E. cyclops is oviparous.

References

Further reading
Brown WC (1991). "Lizards of the Genus Emoia (Scincidae) with Observations on Their Evolution and Biogeography". Memoirs of the California Academy of Sciences (15): i–vi, 1–94. (Emoia cyclops, new species, p. 24).

Emoia
Reptiles described in 1991
Reptiles of Indonesia
Endemic fauna of Indonesia
Taxa named by Walter Creighton Brown